Erich Bloch (January 9, 1925 – November 25, 2016) was a German-born American electrical engineer and administrator. He was involved with developing IBM's first transistorized supercomputer, 7030 Stretch, and mainframe computer, System/360. He served as director of the National Science Foundation from 1984 to 1990.

Biography
Bloch was born in Sulzburg, Germany in 1925. Bloch was the son of Josef Bloch a Jewish businessman and Lina Rothschild a housewife, who were both later murdered in the Holocaust. He survived the war in a refugee camp in Switzerland and emigrated in 1948 to the United States. He studied electrical engineering at ETH Zurich and received his Bachelor of Science in electrical engineering from the University of Buffalo.

Bloch joined IBM after graduating in 1952. He was engineering manager of IBM's STRETCH supercomputer system and director of several research sites during his career. In June 1984, Ronald Reagan nominated Bloch to succeed Edward Alan Knapp become director of the National Science Foundation. The same year, he was elected a foreign member of the Royal Swedish Academy of Engineering Sciences. In 1985, Bloch was awarded one of the first National Medals of Technology and Innovation along with Bob O. Evans and Fred Brooks for their work on the IBM System/360.

After stepping down as director of the National Science Foundation, Bloch joined the Council on Competitiveness as its first distinguished fellow. The IEEE Computer Society awarded him the Computer Pioneer Award in 1993 for high speed computing. In 2002, the National Science Board honored Bloch with the Vannevar Bush Award. He was made a Fellow of the Computer History Museum in 2004 "for engineering management of the IBM Stretch supercomputer, and of the Solid Logic Technology used in the IBM System/360, which revolutionized the computer industry."

Bloch died at the age of 91 from complications of Alzheimer's disease on 25 November 2016 in Washington, D.C.

Awards
National Medal of Technology and Innovation (1985)
Computer Pioneer Award (1993)
Vannevar Bush Award (2002)
Computer History Museum Fellow (2004)

References

External links
Erich Bloch profile via Washington Advisory Group
Erich Bloch profile via IEEE
Erich Bloch profile via IBM

1925 births
2016 deaths
People from Sulzburg
People from the Republic of Baden
20th-century German Jews
American electrical engineers
IBM Research computer scientists
Members of the United States National Academy of Engineering
Members of the Royal Swedish Academy of Engineering Sciences
National Medal of Technology recipients
University at Buffalo alumni
George H. W. Bush administration personnel
Reagan administration personnel
German emigrants to the United States